The 2012 season was São Paulo's 83rd year since the club's existence. After finishing the national league in sixth position in previous season, the team was not able to take part on Copa Libertadores for the second year consecutive thus participating in national cup, Copa do Brasil. In Campeonato Paulista, the team reached semifinals for a straight third year losing to Santos in their own field, the rival was consecrated champion in all these years. In the Copa do Brasil, Tricolor was also defeated in the same stage, this time for Cortiba, after lose the second match by 2–0, remaining an aggregate score of 2–1 to opponent. However the second half of season bring great results for The Dearest, finishing 4th position in league and an international title of Copa Sudamericana in the end of year. The Tricolor won the trophy for the first time against Argentine club Tigre in a troubled match that opponent refused to play the second half of final match in Morumbi. São Paulo was winning by 2–0, goals by Lucas at 22' and Osvaldo at 28' when referee whistled the final of match without return of Argentines to field, was the 12th international official title in Tricolor's history.

Players

Current squad

 (on loan from Arsenal)

Out on loan

Transfers

In

Out

Statistics

Appearances and goals

{{Efs player|no=11|name=Ademilson<sup>1 </sup>                     |pos=FW|nat=BRA|0+2|0|0+1|0|9+14|3|4+2|1}}

|}
1Ademilson became nº 11 during the season. Before he was nº 29

Top scorers

Top assists

Disciplinary record
{| class="wikitable" style="font-size: 95%; text-align: center;"
|-
| rowspan="2"  style="width:5%; text-align:center;"|Position| rowspan="2"  style="width:5%; text-align:center;"|Nation| rowspan="2"  style="width:5%; text-align:center;"|Number| rowspan="2"  style="width:15%; text-align:center;"|Name| colspan="3" style="text-align:center;"|Campeonato Paulista| colspan="3" style="text-align:center;"|Copa do Brasil| colspan="3" style="text-align:center;"|Campeonato Brasileiro| colspan="3" style="text-align:center;"|Copa Sudamericana| colspan="3" style="text-align:center;"|Total|-
!  style="width:60px; background:#fe9;"| 
!  style="width:60px; background:#ff8888;"|
!  style="width:60px; background:#ff8888;"|
!  style="width:60px; background:#fe9;"|
!  style="width:60px; background:#ff8888;"|
!  style="width:60px; background:#ff8888;"|
!  style="width:60px; background:#fe9;"|
!  style="width:60px; background:#ff8888;"|
!  style="width:60px; background:#ff8888;"|
!  style="width:60px; background:#fe9;"|
!  style="width:60px; background:#ff8888;"|
!  style="width:60px; background:#ff8888;"|
!  style="width:60px; background:#fe9;"|
!  style="width:60px; background:#ff8888;"|
!  style="width:60px; background:#ff8888;"|
|-
|GK
|
|1
|Rogério Ceni|0
|0
|0
|0
|0
|0
|2
|0
|0
|3
|0
|0
|5|0|0|-
|DF
|
|2
|Iván Piris|5
|0
|0
|0
|0
|0
|0
|0
|0
|0
|0
|0
|5|0|0|-
|DF
|
|3
|Rafael Toloi|0
|0
|0
|0
|0
|0
|8
|0
|0
|2
|0
|0
|10|0|0|-
|DF
|
|4
|Rhodolfo|2
|0
|0
|1
|0
|0
|5
|1
|0
|3
|0
|0
|11|1|0|-
|MF
|
|5
|Wellington|3
|0
|0
|0
|0
|0
|7
|0
|0
|5
|0
|0
|15|0|0|-
|DF
|
|6
|Cortez|1
|0
|0
|1
|0
|0
|5
|0
|0
|2
|0
|0
|9|0|0|-
|FW
|
|7
|Lucas|0
|0
|0
|3
|0
|0
|4
|0
|0
|1
|0
|0
|8|0|0|-
|MF
|
|8
|Fabrício|0
|0
|0
|0
|0
|0
|0
|0
|0
|0
|0
|0
|0|0|0'|-
|MF
|
|8
|PH Ganso|0
|0
|0
|0
|0
|0
|0
|0
|0
|0
|0
|0
|0|0|0|-
|FW
|
|9
|Luís Fabiano|3
|0
|0
|1
|0
|0
|9
|1
|0
|1
|0
|1
|14|1|1|-
|MF
|
|10
|Jádson|1
|0
|0
|0
|0
|0
|3
|0
|0
|0
|0
|0
|4|0|0|-
|FW
|
|11
|Ademilson|0
|0
|0
|0
|0
|0
|2
|0
|0
|0
|0
|0
|2|0|0|-
|FW
|
|12
|Fernandinho|4
|0
|0
|1
|0
|0
|0
|0
|0
|0
|0
|0
|5|0|0|-
|MF
|
|12
|Paulo Assunção|0
|0
|0
|0
|0
|0
|3
|0
|0
|0
|0
|0
|3|0|0|-
|DF
|
|13
|Paulo Miranda|5
|1
|0
|3
|1
|0
|5
|0
|0
|0
|0
|1
|13|2|1|-
|DF
|
|14
|Edson Silva|0
|0
|0
|0
|0
|0
|2
|0
|0
|0
|0
|0
|2|0|0|-
|MF
|
|15
|Denílson|5
|0
|0
|4
|0
|0
|10
|1
|0
|4
|0
|0
|23|1|0|-
|MF
|
|16
|Cícero|3
|1
|0
|1
|0
|0
|1
|0
|0
|0
|0
|0
|5|1|0|-
|FW
|
|17
|Osvaldo|1
|0
|0
|0
|0
|0
|2
|0
|0
|2
|0
|0
|5|0|0|-
|MF
|
|18
|Maicon|1
|0
|0
|0
|0
|0
|6
|0
|0
|1
|0
|0
|8|0|0|-
|FW
|
|19
|Willian José|0
|0
|1
|0
|0
|0
|1
|1
|0
|0
|0
|0
|1|1|1|-
|MF
|
|20
|Marcelo Cañete|0
|0
|0
|0
|0
|0
|0
|0
|0
|0
|0
|0
|0|0|0|-
|DF
|
|21
|João Filipe|2
|0
|1
|0
|0
|0
|5
|0
|0
|0
|0
|0
|7|0|1|-
|GK
|
|22
|Denis|0
|0
|0
|0
|0
|0
|1
|0
|0
|0
|0
|0
|1|0|0|-
|DF
|
|23
|Douglas|0
|0
|0
|2
|0
|0
|7
|0
|1
|1
|0
|0
|10|0|1|-
|MF
|
|25
|Rodrigo Caio|3
|1
|0
|0
|0
|0
|2
|1
|0
|1
|0
|0
|6|2|0|-
|DF
|
|26
|Henrique Miranda|0
|0
|0
|0
|0
|0
|0
|0
|0
|0
|0
|0
|0|0|0|-
|FW
|
|27
|Rafinha|0
|0
|0
|0
|0
|0
|0
|0
|0
|0
|0
|0
|0|0|0|-
|MF
|
|28
|Casemiro|4
|1
|0
|2
|0
|0
|3
|0
|0
|0
|0
|0
|9|1|0|-
|DF
|
|30
|Luiz Eduardo|0
|0
|0
|0
|0
|0
|0
|0
|0
|0
|0
|0
|0|0|0|-
|DF
|
|32
|Danilo|0
|0
|0
|0
|0
|0
|0
|0
|0
|0
|0
|0
|0|0|0|-
|DF
|
|34
|Bruno Uvini|0
|0
|0
|0
|0
|0
|0
|0
|0
|0
|0
|0
|0|0|0|-
|MF
|
|35
|Juninho|0
|0
|0
|0
|0
|0
|0
|0
|0
|0
|0
|0
|0|0|0|-
|DF
|
|31
|Lucas Farias|0
|0
|0
|0
|0
|0
|0
|0
|0
|0
|0
|0
|0|0|0|-
|MF
|
|36
|João Schmidt|0
|0
|0
|0
|0
|0
|0
|0
|0
|0
|0
|0
|0|0|0|-
|GK
|
|40
|Léo|0
|0
|0
|0
|0
|0
|0
|0
|0
|0
|0
|0
|0|0|0|-
|GK
|
|41
|Leonardo|0
|0
|0
|0
|0
|0
|0
|0
|0
|0
|0
|0
|0|0|0|-
|
|
|
|Total|43|4|2|19|1|0|93|5|1|26|0|2|181|10|5'''

Managers performance

Competitions

Overall

{|class="wikitable"
|-
|Games played || 78 (21 Campeonato Paulista, 9 Copa do Brasil, 38 Campeonato Brasileiro, 10 Copa Sudamericana)
|-
|Games won || 45 (14 Campeonato Paulista, 6 Copa do Brasil, 20 Campeonato Brasileiro, 5 Copa Sudamericana)
|-
|Games drawn || 16 (4 Campeonato Paulista, 1 Copa do Brasil, 6 Campeonato Brasileiro, 5 Copa Sudamericana)
|-
|Games lost || 17 (3 Campeonato Paulista, 2 Copa do Brasil, 12 Campeonato Brasileiro, 0 Copa Sudamericana)
|-
|Goals scored || 139
|-
|Goals conceded || 72
|-
|Goal difference || +67
|-
|Yellow cards || 181
|-
|Second yellow cards || 10
|-
|Red cards || 5
|-
|Worst discipline || Denílson (23 , 1 , 0)
|-
|Best result || 5–0 (H) v Universidad de Chile - Copa Sudamericana - 2012.11.07
|-
|Worst result || 0–3 (A) v Náutico - Campeonato Brasileiro - 2012.08.15
|-
|Most appearances || Cortez (74)
|-
|Top scorer || Luís Fabiano (31)
|-

Campeonato Paulista

Results summary

First phase

Quarter-final

Semi-final

Copa do Brasil

Results Summary

First phase

Second phase

Round of 16

Quarter-finals

Semi-finals

Campeonato Brasileiro

Results Summary

Results by round

Matches

Copa Sudamericana

Results Summary

Second stage

Round of 16

Quarter-finals

Semi-finals

Finals

Injuries during the season

References

External links
official website 

São Paulo FC seasons
Sao Paulo F.C.